An election to Lancashire County Council took place on 6 May 2021, with counting on 8 May, as part of the 2021 United Kingdom local elections. All 84 councillors are elected from electoral divisions for a four-year term of office.  The system of voting used is first-past-the-post. Elections are held in all electoral divisions across the present ceremonial county, excepting Blackpool and Blackburn with Darwen which are unitary authorities.

Council composition
Prior to the election the composition of the council was:

Conservative Party: 44
Labour Party: 30
Liberal Democrats: 4
Independent: 4
Green: 1
Vacant: 1

Electoral divisions
Boundary revisions by the Local Government Boundary Commission for England meant these elections were fought on new divisions, since 2017.

Summary of candidates

Notes
In Hyndburn, one candidate stands for UK Independence Party
In Preston, one candidate stands for the Heritage Party
In Rossendale, one candidate stands for Community First
In South Ribble, one candidate stands for the For Britain Movement
In West Lancashire, three candidates stand for Skelmersdale Independents and one for Workers' Party of Britain
In Wyre, one candidate stands for the Social Democratic Party

Results Summary

Results by district

Results by division

Burnley

Chorley

Fylde

Hyndburn

Lancaster

Pendle

Preston

}

Ribble Valley

Rossendale

South Ribble

West Lancashire

 

 

 

 

 

 

 

}

Wyre

Notes and references
References

Notes

External links
Lancashire County Council - Elections 2021
LCC - Results Reports 2021

2021 English local elections
2021